The Stahl House (also known as Case Study House #22) is a modernist-styled house designed by architect Pierre Koenig in the Hollywood Hills section of Los Angeles, California, which is known as a frequent set location in American films. Photographic and anecdotal evidence shows that the architect's client, Buck Stahl, provided the inspiration for the overall cantilevered structure.  In 2013 it was listed on the National Register of Historic Places.

History
Built in 1959 as part of the Case Study Houses program, the house is considered an iconic representation of modern architecture in Los Angeles during the twentieth century. It was made famous by a Julius Shulman photograph showing two women leisurely sitting in a corner of the house with an eventide panoramic view of the city through floor-to-ceiling glass walls.

In 1999, the house was declared a Los Angeles Historic-Cultural Monument. In 2007, the American Institute of Architects listed the Stahl House (#140) as one of the top 150 structures on its "America's Favorite Architecture" list, one of only eleven in Southern California, and the only privately owned home on the list.

The house was included among the ten best houses in Los Angeles in a Los Angeles Times survey of experts in December 2008.

The house has been used in numerous fashion shoots, films, and advertising campaigns.  Films include Smog (1962); The First Power (1990); The Marrying Man (1991); Corrina, Corrina (1994); Playing by Heart (1998), where it was used as the home of Jon Stewart’s character; Why Do Fools Fall In Love (1998); Galaxy Quest (1999), as the home of Tim Allen's character; Nurse Betty (2000); and Where the Truth Lies (2005).  Television shows include Adam-12, Emergency!, Columbo, and The Simpsons. The house is prominently featured in the music videos for I Don't Wanna Stop (2003) by ATB, "Missing Cleveland" by Scott Weiland, and also "Release Me" by Wilson Phillips. A look-alike was also included in the 2004 video game Grand Theft Auto: San Andreas as one of the safehouses players can buy. The house was used twice as a filming location for Columbo, (Prescription: Murder), including an episode directed by Steven Spielberg.

See also
Los Angeles Historic-Cultural Monuments in Hollywood

References

Further reading

External links

Virtual reality open house

Hollywood Hills
Houses completed in 1960
Los Angeles Historic-Cultural Monuments
Houses on the National Register of Historic Places in Los Angeles
Modernist architecture in California